The Schlechtenberg Solarpark consists of 33,000 solar panels by Hanwha SolarOne, has a length of  and a width of . Inaugurated in September 2013, it was the largest photovoltaic power station in the Allgäu, Swabia, Germany.

See also

Photovoltaic power stations
Solar power in Germany

References

Photovoltaic power stations in Germany